Voznesensky is a rural locality (a village) in Nikolsky Selsoviet, Nurimanovsky District, Bashkortostan, Russia. The population was 37 as of 2010. There is 1 street.

Geography 
Voznesensky is located 14 km east of Krasnaya Gorka (the district's administrative centre) by road. Nikolskoye is the nearest rural locality.

References 

Rural localities in Nurimanovsky District